Damasceno is a Portuguese surname.

Notable people with this surname include:
 Darlan Bispo Damasceno, Brazilian footballer
 José Damasceno, is a Mexican-Brazilian footballer
 Leônidas Soares Damasceno, Brazilian footballer
 Marco Damasceno, Brazilian footballer
 Murilo Damasceno Neto, Brazilian footballer
 Raymundo Damasceno Assis, Brazilian cardinal